Yannick Daniel Quesnel (born 24 October 1973) is a French retired footballer who played as a goalkeeper.

Most of his professional career was spent in Portugal, notably playing in two Primeira Liga seasons with Alverca. He also represented Benfica for five months.

Football career
Born in Libourne, Aquitaine, Quesnel's early professional career in his country was highly unsuccessful, as he only managed to appear with FC Sochaux-Montbéliard and FC Girondins de Bordeaux's reserve teams over five seasons combined, eventually moving to Ligue 2 club AS Cannes. In 2000, he began an adventure in Portugal that would last five years, starting with second division's Associação Naval 1º de Maio and signing with F.C. Alverca in the following year.

After stellar performances at Alverca, at the time S.L. Benfica's farm team, which included winning the Goalkeeper of the Year award in 2001–02 even though the former suffered Primeira Liga relegation, Quesnel signed with precisely the latter on a three-year contract. Being only third-choice behind José Moreira and Quim, however, he would spend the next one and a half seasons loaned, one of those back in his country with Olympique de Marseille.

After an unassuming campaign with AS Monaco FC, having already cut ties with Benfica (he did not manage to appear once in the league with both Ligue 1 sides combined), Quesnel played the remainder of his career in French amateur football.

Honours

Club
Marseille
UEFA Intertoto Cup: 2005

Benfica
Supertaça Cândido de Oliveira: Runner-up 2004

Individual
Primeira Liga: Goalkeeper of the Year 2002

References

External links

1973 births
Living people
People from Libourne
Sportspeople from Gironde
French footballers
Association football goalkeepers
Ligue 2 players
FC Sochaux-Montbéliard players
FC Libourne players
FC Girondins de Bordeaux players
AS Cannes players
Olympique de Marseille players
AS Monaco FC players
Primeira Liga players
Liga Portugal 2 players
Associação Naval 1º de Maio players
F.C. Alverca players
S.L. Benfica footballers
G.D. Estoril Praia players
French expatriate footballers
Expatriate footballers in Portugal
French expatriate sportspeople in Portugal
Footballers from Nouvelle-Aquitaine